Mount Stakes is a mountain in the Diablo Range in California. The peak is located on the Santa Clara–Stanislaus county line and is located less than 1 mile north of Henry W. Coe State Park. Some snow falls on the peak during the winter.

See also 
 
 List of highest points in California by county
 List of summits of the San Francisco Bay Area

References

External links 
 

Diablo Range
Mountains of the San Francisco Bay Area
Mountains of Santa Clara County, California
Mountains of Stanislaus County, California
Mountains of Northern California